

St. George Airport  is a county-owned, public-use airport located three nautical miles (6 km) east of the central business district of St. George, a city in Dorchester County, South Carolina, United States. It is included in the National Plan of Integrated Airport Systems for 2011–2015, which categorized it as a general aviation facility.

Facilities and aircraft 
St. George Airport covers an area of 103 acres (42 ha) at an elevation of 85 feet (26 m) above mean sea level. It has one runway designated 5/23 with an asphalt surface measuring 3,201 by 60 feet (976 x 18 m).

For the 12-month period ending April 20, 2011, the airport had 5,200 general aviation aircraft operations, an average of 14 per day. At that time there were 12 aircraft based at this airport: 58% single-engine and 42% ultralight.

See also 

References

External links 

 Airport page at Dorchester County website
 St. George (6J2) at the South Carolina Aeronautics Commission
 Aerial image as of February 1994 from USGS The National Map
 
 

Airports in South Carolina
Transportation in Dorchester County, South Carolina